Lakemoor is a village in Lake and McHenry counties in the U.S. state of Illinois. Per the 2020 census, the population was 6,182.

Geography
Lakemoor is located at  (42.3401437, -88.2031240).

Major streets
 
 
  Rand Road/Belvidere Road
 Bay Road
 Chapel Hill Road
 Lincoln Road
 Cuhlman Road
 Lily Lake Road
 Darrell Road
 Sullivan Lake Road
 Fox Lake Road
 Volo Village Road
 Gilmer Road

Demographics

2020 census

2000 Census
As of the census of 2000, there were 2,788 people, 1,014 households, and 717 families residing in the village. The racial makeup of the village was 92.72% White, 0.65% African American, 0.14% Native American, 1.83% Asian, 0.18% Pacific Islander, 2.87% from other races, and 1.61% from two or more races. Hispanic or Latino of any race were 7.03% of the population.

There were 1,014 households, out of which 42.4% had children under the age of 18 living with them, 60.0% were married couples living together, 7.6% had a female householder with no husband present, and 29.2% were non-families. 20.6% of all households were made up of individuals, and 3.6% had someone living alone who was 65 years of age or older. The average household size was 2.75 and the average family size was 3.24.

In the village, the population was spread out, with 30.7% under the age of 18, 7.6% from 18 to 24, 41.9% from 25 to 44, 15.1% from 45 to 64, and 4.6% who were 65 years of age or older. The median age was 30 years. For every 100 females, there were 107.6 males. For every 100 females age 18 and over, there were 105.9 males.

The median income for a household in the village was $56,217, and the median income for a family was $60,542. Males had a median income of $48,510 versus $32,841 for females. The per capita income for the village was $22,499. About 9.5% of families and 8.7% of the population were below the poverty line, including 9.3% of those under age 18 and 10.7% of those age 65 or over.

Since the census in 2000, Lakemoor has had numerous new developments which has greatly increased the population of the city. Lakemoor Farms, The Meadows, and The Pines of Lakemoor have created an influx of new homes in the area, which is prompting interest in retail and other city centers for the new residents. A new large store anchored strip mall has been planned and approved to open in two phases on the corner of Route 120 and U.S. Route 12.

Recreation
A village park, with playground, basketball and volleyball courts, and a beach occupy its eastern shores, while a boat launch provides water access from IL-Rte 120. Boat motors are limited to under 10 horsepower, but a small electrical motor provides enough power for access anywhere on the lake. The lake is populated by largemouth bass (catch and release only), bluegill, crappie, carp, and perch.

The Fox River flows through the area, providing ample opportunity for summer and winter water sports.

Four state parks and six county conservation areas are nearby, including Moraine Hills State Park and the Volo Bog State Natural Area.

Schools
Lakemoor falls within the boundaries of several school districts, including McHenry Elementary School District #15, Big Hollow Elementary School District #38, Wauconda Unit School District #118, Grant High School District #124, and McHenry Community High School District #156. There are private religious schools in Wauconda and in Grant Township.

Government services
Lakemoor's Police Department consists of six sworn officers. Fire protection is provided by the Fox Lake Fire Department and the McHenry and Wauconda Township Fire Protection Districts.

Lakemoor's primary source of revenue is from three cameras at the busy intersection of IL Route 120 and US Route 12, which have generated $19.2 million since 2012.

Transportation
U.S. Route 12 and Illinois Route 120 traverse the village.

 Distance to the Chicago Loop: 
 Distance to O'Hare Airport: 
 Distance to Mitchell Field: 
 Distance to Downtown Milwaukee:

References

External links
Village of Lakemoor official website

Chicago metropolitan area
Villages in Lake County, Illinois
Villages in McHenry County, Illinois
Villages in Illinois